Deere & Company, doing business as John Deere, is an American corporation that manufactures agricultural machinery, heavy equipment, forestry machinery, diesel engines, drivetrains (axles, transmissions, gearboxes) used in heavy equipment, and lawn care equipment. The company also provides financial services and other related activities.

Deere & Company is listed on the New York Stock Exchange under the symbol DE. The company's slogan is "Nothing Runs Like a Deere", and its logo is a leaping deer, with the words 'JOHN DEERE' under it. Various logos incorporating a leaping deer have been used by the company for over 155 years. Deere & Company is headquartered in Moline, Illinois.

Deere & Company ranked  in the 2022 Fortune 500 list of the largest United States corporations. Their different tractor series include D series, E series, Speciality Tractors, Super Heavy Duty Tractors, and JDLink.

19th century 

Deere & Company began when John Deere, born in Rutland, Vermont, United States on February 7, 1804, moved to Grand Detour, Illinois in 1836, to escape bankruptcy in Vermont. Already an established blacksmith, Deere opened a  shop in Grand Detour in 1837, which allowed him to serve as a general repairman in the village, as well as a manufacturer of tools such as pitchforks and shovels.
Tools were just a start; the item that set him apart was the self-scouring steel plow, which was pioneered in 1837 when John Deere fashioned a Scottish steel saw blade into a plow. Prior to Deere's steel plow, most farmers used iron or wooden plows to which the rich Midwestern soil stuck, so they had to be cleaned frequently. The smooth-sided steel plow solved this problem and greatly aided migration into the American Great Plains in the 19th and early 20th centuries.

The traditional way of doing business was to make the product as and when it was ordered. This style was very slow. As Deere realized that this was not going to be a viable business model, he increased the rate of production by manufacturing plows before putting them up for sale; this allowed customers to not only see what they were buying beforehand but also allowed his customers to purchase his products straight away. Word of his products began to spread quickly.

In 1842, Deere entered a business partnership with Leonard Andrus and purchased land for the construction of a new, two-story factory along the Rock River in Illinois. This factory, named the "L. Andrus Plough Manufacturer", produced about 100 plows in 1842, and around 400 plows during the next year. Deere's partnership with Andrus ended in 1848, and Deere relocated to Moline, Illinois, to have access to the railroad and the Mississippi River. There, Deere formed a partnership with Robert Tate and John Gould and built a  factory the same year. Production rose quickly, and by 1849, the Deere, Tate & Gould Company was producing over 200 plows a month. A two-story addition to the plant was built, allowing further production.

Deere bought out Tate and Gould's interests in the company in 1853, and was joined in the business by his son Charles Deere. At that time, the company was manufacturing a variety of farm equipment products in addition to plows, including wagons, corn planters, and cultivators. In 1857, the company's production totals reached almost 1,120 implements per month. In 1858, a nationwide financial recession took a toll on the company. To prevent bankruptcy, the company was reorganized and Deere sold his interests in the business to his son-in-law, Christopher Webber, and his son, Charles Deere, who would take on most of his father's managerial roles. John Deere served as president of the company until his retirement in April 1886, but died one month later in May 1886. The company was reorganized again in 1868 when it was incorporated as Deere & Company. While the company's original stockholders were Charles Deere, Stephen Velie, George Vinton, and John Deere, Charles effectively ran the company. In 1869, Charles began to introduce marketing centers and independent retail dealers to advance the company's sales nationwide. This same year, Deere & Company won "Best and Greatest Display of Plows in Variety" at the 17th Annual Illinois State Fair, for which it won $10 and a silver medal.

The core focus remained on the agricultural implements, but John Deere also made a few bicycles in the 1890s.

20th century 

Increased competition during the early 1900s from the new International Harvester Company led the company to expand its offerings in the implement business, but the production of gasoline tractors came to define Deere & Company's operations during the 20th century.
 
In 1912, Deere & Company president William Butterworth (Charles' son-in-law), who had replaced Charles Deere after his death in 1907, began the company's expansion into the tractor business. Deere & Company briefly experimented with its own tractor models, the most successful of which was the Dain All-Wheel-Drive, but in the end decided to continue its foray into the tractor business by purchasing the Waterloo Gasoline Engine Company in 1918, which manufactured the popular Waterloo Boy tractor at its facilities in Waterloo, Iowa. Deere & Company continued to sell tractors under the Waterloo Boy name until 1923, when the John Deere Model D was introduced. The company continues to manufacture a large percentage of its tractors in Waterloo, Iowa, namely the 7R, 8R, and 9R series.

The company produced its first combine harvester, the John Deere No. 2, in 1927. A year later, this innovation was followed up by the introduction of John Deere No. 1, a smaller machine that was more popular with customers. By 1929, the No. 1 and No. 2 were replaced by newer, lighter-weight harvesters. In the 1930s, John Deere and other farm equipment manufacturers began developing hillside harvesting technology. Harvesters now had the ability to effectively use their combines to harvest grain on hillsides with up to a 50% slope gradient.

On an episode of the Travel Channel series Made in America that profiled Deere & Company, host John Ratzenberger stated that the company never repossessed any equipment from American farmers during the Great Depression.

During World War II, the great-grandson of John Deere, Charles Deere Wiman, was president of the company, but he accepted a commission as a colonel in the U.S. Army. Burton F. Peek was hired as president during this period. Before Wiman returned to work at the company in late 1944, he directed the farm machinery and equipment division of the War Production Board. In addition to farm machinery, John Deere manufactured military tractors, and transmissions for the M3 tank. They also made aircraft parts, ammunition, and mobile laundry units to support the war effort.

In 1947, John Deere introduced its first self-propelled combine, model 55. It was soon followed by the smaller models 40 and 45, the larger model 95, and an even larger model 105 was introduced in the 1960s. In the mid-1950s, Deere introduced attachable corn heads, allowing crop producers to cut, shell, and clean corn in one smooth operation.

In 1956, Deere & Company bought-out the German tractor manufacturer, Heinrich Lanz AG (see Lanz Bulldog).

In the last months of 1958, John Deere constructed a factory in northern Rosario, Argentina. In Argentina, the make was managed by Agar Cross & Co.
John Deere made the following models of tractors in Argentina: 445, 730; the models of the series 20 like 1420, 2420, 3420, 4420; the models of the serie 30 like 2330, 2530, 2730, 3330, 3530, 4530; the models of the serie 40 like 2140, 3140 / 3140 DT, 3440, 3540 and the last made in Baigorria of the serie 50 like 2850, 3350, 3550 until 1994.
Seventeen years later, (in 2011) the Argentinian plant returns the assembly of tractors with the following models: 5036C, 5045D (45 HP) Serie 5D, 5045E (45 HP) Serie 5E, 5065E (65 HP) Serie 5E, 5075E (75 HP) Serie 5E, 5425N (77 HP) Serie 5000, 5725 (92 HP) Serie 5025, 5725HC (92 HP) Serie 5025, 5090E, 5090EH, 5076EF, 6110J, 6130J, 6145J and 6165J.

Plus, in 2012, added in SKD/CKD format, the assembly of combine harvesters 9570 STS Serie 70, 9470 STS, 9670 STS and 9770 STS.

Also with the green line, the Argentinian facility made some backhoe loaders and motor graders like 570 A/B, 544 A/B, 507, 308, 200 and the 627, 727 model tractors.

On August 30, 1960, John Deere dealers from around the world converged on Dallas, Texas, for an unprecedented product showcase. Deere Day in Dallas, as the event was called, introduced the world to the "New Generation of Power", the company's first modern four-cylinder and six-cylinder tractors, during a day packed with high-tech presentations, live demonstrations, and a parking lot full of brand-new green and yellow machines. The line of tractors introduced that day was five years in the making, and the event itself took months to plan. Deere chose Dallas to host the event partly because it was home to facilities large enough to accommodate the 6,000 guests and the equipment they were all there to see. The Dallas Memorial Auditorium, the Texas State Fairgrounds Coliseum, the Cotton Bowl, and the Cotton Bowl parking lot were each the site of part of the event. During the event, a new John Deere tractor with a diamond-covered nameplate was displayed for all to see inside Neiman-Marcus, a popular Dallas-based department store.

According to information released by the company at the time of the event, John Deere dealers and key employees came to Dallas via the "largest commercial airlift of its type ever attempted". During the 24 hours leading up to the event, 16 airlines brought Deere employees and salespeople from all over the United States and Canada to Love Field in Dallas. Bill Hewitt, then chairman and CEO of Deere & Company, welcomed the dealers and introduced the new tractors. Hewitt told the guests they were about to see "a line of entirely new tractors – completely modern in every respect – with outstanding features not duplicated in any other make of tractor".

Since entering the tractor business in 1918, John Deere had focused on two-cylinder machines. The New Generation of Power introduced at Deere Day in Dallas was very different from anything Deere had built before. The new line of four- and six-cylinder tractors, the models 1010, 2010, 3010, and 4010, were more far more powerful than Deere's two-cylinder models, and also easier and more comfortable to operate, with conveniently located controls, better visibility, and improved seat suspension. These new tractors were also easier to service.

The 4010 was rated at 80 horsepower in 1960, but tested at 84 horsepower during testing trials, making it one of the most powerful two-wheel-drive farm tractors at that time. The 4010 was the predecessor to the 4020, which is widely regarded as the most popular tractor ever produced by John Deere, and perhaps any tractor manufacturer in the United States. Although the 4020, which was available with Deere's optional Power Shift, enjoyed greater popularity, the 4010 moved John Deere into the modern era of farm tractor technology and design following its successful history as a tractor manufacturer that was by the late 1950s experiencing waning market share due to its outdated technology.

In addition to the advanced engine technology, the "10" series tractors offered many other upgrades from the older two-cylinder models they replaced, including significantly higher horsepower-to-weight ratio, advanced hydraulics, more convenient and comfortable operator stations, and many other improvements. Of the "10" series John Deere tractors introduced in 1960, the 4010 was by far the most popular, with more than 58,000 units sold from 1960 to 1963. The success of the "10" series John Deere tractors, led by the 4010, helped propel John Deere from a 23% market share in 1959 to 34% by 1964 when the 4020 was introduced, making it the top manufacturer of farm equipment in the United States.

In 1973, Deere introduced its new 'Soundguard' tractors, the 4030, 4230, 4430, and 4630. While these tractors were mechanically similar to the New Generation tractors they replaced, and the 4230, 4430, and 4630 used a 404-cubic-inch displacement engine like the 4020, they featured redesigned sheet metal and most importantly they were available with an optional completely integrated operator's cab that John Deere called the Sound Gard body. This insulated cab that included a roll-over protective structure had a distinctive rounded windshield and came equipped with heat and air conditioning, as well as speakers for an optional radio. An 8-track tape player was also available as an option. The 5020 was replaced by the very similar 6030 and continued in production with New Generation styling until 1977 when the 30 Series tractors were replaced by Deere's 'Iron Horses' series that included the 90-hp 4040, 110-hp 4240, 130-hp 4440, 150-HP 4640, and 180-hp 4840. The 4240, 4440, 4640, and 4840 featured a new 466-cubic-inch displacement engine, and improvements to the cab including an optional hydraulic seat for a smoother ride. The Sound Gard body and Power Shift transmission were standard equipment on the 4840.

In 1983, Deere introduced the 4050, 4250, 4450, 4650, and 4850. These tractors were essentially the same machines as the Iron Horses they replaced, but with significant upgrades. They offered a new 15-speed PowerShift transmission and were available with an optional mechanical front-wheel drive featuring caster action for better traction and a tighter turning radius. They also featured cosmetic upgrades, including a new light brown cab interior, instead of the black interior on previous models. These tractors were followed by the mechanically similar 55 and 60 series tractors before they were replaced by Deere's completely redesigned 7000 and 8000 series tractors in the early 1990s.

In the 1962 Illinois Manufacturers Directory (50th-anniversary edition), John Deere, listed as Deere and Company, claimed a total workforce of 35,000, of which 9,000 were in Illinois. The corporate headquarters were located at 1325 Third Ave. in Moline, Illinois, with six manufacturing plants located around that city and a seventh plant in Hoopeston, Illinois. The six plants in Moline were listed as:
John Deere Harvester Works at 1100 - 13th Ave., East Moline, where 3,000 employees made agricultural implements 
John Deere Industrial Equipment Works at 301 Third Ave., Moline, where 500 employees made earth-moving equipment 
John Deere Malleable Works at 1335-13th Street, East Moline, where 600 employees made malleable and nodular iron castings
John Deere Planter Works at 501 Third Ave., Moline, where 1,000 employees made agricultural implements 
John Deere Plow Works at 1225 Third Ave., Moline, where 1,100 employees made agricultural implements
John Deere Spreader Works at 1209-13th Ave., Moline where 800 employees made agricultural implements

The John Deere Vermilion Works was located at North Sixth Ave., Hoopeston, Illinois, where 140 employees were listed as making iron work and implement parts. Moline, with 42,705 residents in 1962, had the local 7,000 employees of John Deere represent 16% of the city's entire population.

In 1969, John Deere followed its New Generation tractors of the 1960s with a New Generation of combines. These included the 3300, 4400, 6600, and 7700. These models were also the first to come with Quik-Tatch header mounting capabilities as standard equipment. In the 1980s, these combines were followed by the 4420, 6620, 7720, and 8820 that were essentially updated and improved versions of the previous models with larger capacity, a better cab, and easier maintenance and service. The 4420 was discontinued in 1984 and replaced by the 4425 combines imported from Germany, and the 6620, 7720, and 8820 received the Titan II updates.

In 1989, Deere replaced the 6620, 7720, and 8820 with a new line of completely redesigned 'Maximizer' combines that included the 9400, 9500, and 9600 walker combines. These combines featured a center-mounted cab, rear-mounted engine, and more comforts in the cab. Also in 1989, Deere was inducted into the National Inventors Hall of Fame. In 1997, Deere celebrated 50 years of self-propelled combine production, and the 1997 models featured a 50th-anniversary decal. In 1998, the 9410, 9510, and 9610 were introduced. These were essentially the same machines, but with minor upgrades. Deere dealers offered '10 series' upgrades to owners of older 9000 series Maximizer combines. In 1999, Deere introduced the 50 series Maximizer combines. These machines featured significant cosmetic upgrades including a more streamlined appearance, improved ergonomics in the cab, PTO shaft-style header hook-up, and the larger models were available as rotary machines which were a complete departure from the combines that Deere had built in the past.

In the late 1970s, International Harvester had pioneered rotary combines with their Axial flow machines and were soon followed by other manufacturers, but Deere continued to build only conventional walker combines through the 1980s and 1990s. In 1999, John Deere introduced the Single-Tine Separation (STS) system on its 9550, 9650, and 9750 combines, representing a step forward in rotary combine technology. The STS system uses less horsepower and improves material handling.

21st century 
, Deere & Company employed about 67,000 people worldwide, of which half are in the United States and Canada, and is the largest agriculture machinery company in the world. In August 2014, the company announced it was indefinitely laying off 600 of its workers at plants in Illinois, Iowa, and Kansas due to less demand for its products. Inside the United States, the company's primary locations are its administrative center in Moline, Illinois, and manufacturing factories in central and southeastern United States. , the company experiments with an electric farm tractor.

The logo of the leaping deer has been used by this company for over 155 years. Over the years, the logo has had minor changes and pieces removed. Some of the older style logos have the deer leaping over a log. The company uses different logo colors for agricultural vs. construction products. The company's agricultural products are identifiable by a distinctive shade of green paint, with the inside border being yellow. While the construction products are identifiable by a shade of black with the deer being yellow, and the inside border also being yellow.

In September 2017, Deere & Company signed a definitive agreement to acquire Blue River Technology, which is based in Sunnyvale, California, and is a leader in applying machine learning to agriculture. Blue River has designed and integrated computer vision and machine learning technology that will enable growers to reduce the use of herbicides by spraying only where weeds are present, optimizing the use of inputs in farming.

On August 29, 2019, it was announced that Samuel R. Allen will step down as CEO and president of John Deere. John May, president of the Worldwide Agriculture and Turf and Integrated Solutions divisions will replace him in November 2019.

In October 2021, about 10,000 employees, unionized with the United Auto Workers, went on strike following an impasse in contract negotiations.

In January 2022, the company introduced a self-driving tractor at the annual Consumer Electronics Show, designed for large-scale farming as opposed to existing comparable tractors designed for small-scale agriculture. It was part of a larger effort to develop so-called smart machines to make farming faster and more efficient than it would be relying on human labor, including through software, which would mean higher margins. The company said it wanted to "connect 1.5 million machines in service and a half billion acres in use to its cloud-based John Deere Operations Center."

Use of the Digital Millennium Copyright Act to prevent user repairs 

John Deere's license covering the internal software on tractor control computers does not allow users or independent mechanics to modify the software. This prevents repairs by farmers and creates a monopoly for John Deere dealerships. John Deere claims user repair is forbidden by the Digital Millennium Copyright Act, through bypassing of digital rights management. Groups including the Electronic Frontier Foundation have criticised this activity, being contrary to the right to repair. Some farmers use Ukrainian versions of John Deere software to circumvent restrictions on repair. In February 2022, the US Senate introduced a bill to allow farmers to perform their own repairs. , 26 states have filed legislation for right-to-repair.

On January 9, 2023, John Deere agreed to allow its US customers to fix their own equipment.

Products 
John Deere manufactures a wide range of products, with several models of each in many cases.

Agricultural equipment 
Agricultural products include, among others, tractors, combine harvesters, cotton harvesters, balers, planters/seeders, silage machines, and sprayers.

Construction equipment 
Construction equipment includes:

Forestry equipment 
John Deere manufactures a range of forestry machinery, among others, harvesters, forwarders, skidders. feller bunchers and log loaders. Timberjack was a subsidiary of John Deere from 2000 to 2006.

Other products 
Other products the company manufactures include consumer and commercial equipment such as lawn mowers, compact utility tractors, snow throwers, snowmobiles, all-terrain vehicles, and StarFire (a wide-area differential GPS). It is also a supplier of diesel engines and powertrains (axles, transmissions, etc.) used especially in heavy equipment.

John Deere leasing has expanded to non-equipment loans. As of 2017, this is the leading division of John Deere. With a loan portfolio of $2 billion, it accounts for a third of John Deere's income.

Non-serviceability by owners or third parties

John Deere farm equipment has been criticised for being impossible to be serviced or repaired by owners or third parties; only John Deere has access to computer code required for this and to accept non-John-Deere replacement parts. Remote locking by the manufacturer may also be possible. This effectively makes the equipment unusable without the continued involvement of John Deere. It was reported that during the 2022 Russian invasion of Ukraine Russian troops stole Ukrainian farm equipment, but that the dealers who owned the equipment locked it remotely.

Factories 

Major North American factories include:
 Harvester Works (large combine harvesters), East Moline, Illinois
 Cylinder Internal Platform (hydraulic cylinders), Moline, Illinois
 Seeding Group (planting equipment), Moline, Illinois and Valley City, North Dakota
 Davenport Works (wheel loaders, motor graders, articulated dump trucks, wheeled forestry equipment), Davenport, Iowa
 Dubuque Works (backhoes, crawlers, skid-steer loaders, tracked forestry equipment), Dubuque, Iowa 
 Des Moines Works (tillage equipment, cotton harvesters, sprayers), Ankeny, Iowa
 Ottumwa Works (hay and forage equipment), Ottumwa, Iowa
 Thibodaux Works (cane-harvesting equipment, scrapers), Thibodaux, Louisiana
 Horicon Works (lawn and garden and turf care), Horicon, Wisconsin
 Augusta Works (small commercial and agricultural tractors), Grovetown, Georgia
 Turf Care (specialty golf equipment and commercial mowing), Fuquay-Varina, North Carolina
 Industrias John Deere (agricultural tractors; construction equipment), (Monterrey, Mexico)
 Motores John Deere (power systems; 6- and 4-cylinder engines, heavy-duty axles), Torreon, Mexico
 Coffeyville Works (transmissions, pump drives, planetaries), Coffeyville, Kansas
 Waterloo Works (tractor, cab, and assembly operations, drivetrain operations, foundry operations, service parts operations), Waterloo, Iowa
 Power Systems and Engine Works (power systems and engines), Waterloo, Iowa
 Greeneville Works (entry-level lawn care equipment), Greeneville, Tennessee

Other important factories:
 John Deere Usine Saran (power systems), Fleury-les-Aubrais, France
 John Deere Argentina (engines, tractors, and combine harvesters), Granadero Baigorria, Santa Fe, Argentina
 John Deere Equipment Pvt Ltd (5000-series tractors), Pune, India
 John Deere Equipment Pvt Ltd (5000-series tractors), Dewas, India
 John Deere Electronic Solutions, Fargo, ND and Pune, India
 John Deere Harvester Works, Sirhind-Fategarh, India
 John Deere Werke Mannheim (6000-series tractors), Mannheim, Germany
 John Deere Brasil: Montenegro, Rio Grande do Sul (tractors), Horizontina - RS (harvesters and planters), Catalão - GO (sugarcane harvesters)
 John Deere Werke Zweibrücken (harvesting equipment), Zweibrücken, Germany
 John Deere Fabriek Horst (pulled and self-propelled agricultural sprayers), Horst, The Netherlands
 John Deere Forestry Oy (forwarders, wheeled harvesters), Joensuu, Finland
 John Deere Reman,

Equipment divisions

Subsidiaries and affiliates

Current 
AGRIS Corporation (John Deere Agri Services)
Bear Flag Robotics – Autonomous agricultural technology & equipment company
John Deere Ag Management Solutions (intelligent mobile equipment technologies), Urbandale, Iowa
John Deere Capital Corporation
John Deere Financial (John Deere Credit and Finance), Johnston, Iowa
Kemper (row tolerant headers for forage harvesters and combines), Stadtlohn, Germany
Waratah Forestry Attachments (forestry harvesting heads), Tokoroa, New Zealand
Agreentech
NavCom Technology, Inc. (precision positioning systems, see also StarFire), Torrance, California
John Deere Electronic Solutions (Ruggedized electronics), Fargo, North Dakota
Ningbo Benye Tractor & Automobile Manufacture Co. Ltd. (low HP tractors), Ningbo, China
Machinefinder (used equipment division and marketplace)
John Deere Technology Innovation Center, Research Park, University of Illinois at Urbana-Champaign
 QCFS and Consolidating (attachment distribution center), Davenport, Iowa
Hagie Sprayers (Upfront Sprayers)
¨KingAgro (Sprayers) Argentina
 PLA (sprayers) Argentina
Wirtgen Group
Blue River Technology – Pioneer in the use of computer vision and robotics for agriculture bringing crop protection into the digital era with see and spray machines that precisely observe and treat each plant in the field.

Former 
John Deere Renewables, LLC, a wind energy plant manufacturing arm which represented John Deere's extension into the renewable energy industry – under which it had successfully completed 36 projects in eight US states – was sold to Exelon Energy in August 2010.

Finances

Carbon footprint
John Deere reported Total CO2e emissions (Direct + Indirect) for the twelve months ending 30 September 2020 at 766 Kt (-155 /-16.8% y-o-y) and plans to reduce emissions 15% by 2022 from a 2017 base year.

Sponsorships 

 The John Deere Classic is an American professional golf tournament sponsored by the company.
 John Deere sponsored the #23 and #97 cars for NASCAR driver Chad Little in the late 1990s.
 John Deere sponsored the #17 car for NASCAR driver Ricky Stenhouse Jr. in the Monster Energy NASCAR Cup Series in the late 2010s.
John Deere previously sponsored the Carolina Hurricanes’ ice resurfacers from early 2000s to mid 2010s.

Green Magazine 
Green Magazine is a publication devoted to John Deere enthusiasts. It was begun in November 1984 by Richard and Carol Hain of Bee, Nebraska.

The first issue was mailed in early November 1984 to 135 paid subscribers and had 10 black-and-white pages with features on tractors, letters from readers, and advertisements. At the time, the magazine was published bimonthly. It was written in Lincoln, Nebraska, and it was mailed from the Bee post office.

The magazine grew rapidly, and in 1990, bowing to public demand, it became a monthly. Circulation continued to increase, and currently hovers around 30,000. The magazine now generally contains 88 full-color pages and is perfect bound. It is now printed in Michigan and mailed from several post offices throughout the country.

Current content usually includes a "Tip of the Month" article covering New Generation restoration written by Dan Brotzman, a "Youngtimer" article written by Tyler Buchheit, "Shop Talk" by Ron and JoAnn O'Neill, "Saw It On eBay" by Adam Smith and Benjamin Hain, "Scale Models" by Bill Proft, "What's New and Old" by Greg Stephen, "Feature Model" by Benjamin Hain, "Do You Have One of These" by Richard Hain, and "Mr. Thinker", which is said to be written by "a variety of experts".

See also 

 John Deere World Headquarters
 List of John Deere tractors
 John Deere Buck

References

Sources

External links 

 
 Green Magazine
 John Deere at RitchieWiki, the Equipment Wiki
John Deere's official youtube 

 
Agricultural machinery manufacturers of the United States
Tractor manufacturers of the United States
Electric tractors
Garden tool manufacturers
Lawn and garden tractors
Power tool manufacturers
Construction equipment manufacturers of the United States
Engine manufacturers of the United States
Diesel engine manufacturers
Defense companies of the United States
Manufacturing companies established in 1837
Manufacturing companies based in Illinois
1837 establishments in Illinois
Moline, Illinois
Companies based in Rock Island County, Illinois
Companies based in the Quad Cities
Companies listed on the New York Stock Exchange
Textile machinery manufacturers
Automotive transmission makers
Electrical generation engine manufacturers
Tool manufacturing companies of the United States